Miguel S. Demapan BSc, MBA, JD, D.Litt. ( 1953 – June 30, 2012) was Chief Justice of the Supreme Court of the Commonwealth of the Northern Mariana Islands from 1999 to 2011.

Born on Saipan, Demapan attended Marianas High School, obtained a Bachelor of Science from the Seattle University in 1975, an MBA at Golden Gate University in 1983, and a JD from Santa Clara University in 1985.

Demapan returned to the Mariana Islands to practice business law. He was called to the judiciary in 1992 as an Associate Judge of the Commonwealth Superior Court, and in 1998 as an associate justice of the Supreme Court. He became Chief Justice in 1999 after being appointed by Governor Pedro Tenorio.

Demapan died of colon cancer on June 30, 2012 in Saipan. He was 59.

References

1950s births
2012 deaths
Chief Justices of the Northern Mariana Islands Supreme Court
Northern Mariana Islands lawyers
Golden Gate University alumni
Seattle University alumni
Santa Clara University alumni
Chamorro people
20th-century American judges